Pseudocydonia sinensis or Chinese quince is a deciduous or semi-evergreen tree in the family Rosaceae, native to southern and eastern China. It is the sole species in the genus Pseudocydonia. Its hard, astringent fruit is used in traditional Chinese medicine and as a food in East Asia.

The tree is closely related to the east Asian genus Chaenomeles, and is sometimes placed as Chaenomeles sinensis, but lacks thorns and has single, not clustered, flowers. Chinese quince is further distinguished from quince, Cydonia oblonga, by its serrated leaves and lack of fuzz.

Names 
In China, both the tree and its fruit are called mùguā, which also refers to papaya and the flowering quince (Chaenomeles speciosa). In Korea the tree is called mogwa-namu and the fruit mogwa (from mokgwa, the Korean reading of the Chinese characters). In Japan, both tree and fruit are called karin (rarely ) except in medicine where the fruit is called wa-mokka from the Chinese and Korean names.

Characteristics 
Trees grow to 10–18 m tall, with a dense, twiggy crown. The leaves are alternately arranged, simple, 6–12 cm long and 3–6 cm broad, and with serrated margin. The flowers are 2.5–4 cm diameter, with five pale pink petals; flowering is in mid spring. The fruit is a large ovoid pome 12–17 cm long with five carpels; it gives off an intense, sweet smell when it ripens in late autumn.

Uses
The fruit is hard and astringent, though it softens and becomes less astringent after a period of frost. It can be used to make jam, much like quince. In Korea, the fruit is used to make mogwa-cheong (preserved quince) and mogwa-cha (quince tea).

The fruit is also used in traditional Chinese medicine.

Chinese quince is also grown as an ornamental tree. In Haeju, North Korea two Chinese Quinces planted in 1910 are national monuments, being probably the tallest of specimens in the country.

Gallery

See also
 Flowering quinces, genus Chaenomeles
 Quince (Cydonia oblonga)

References

Maleae
Monotypic Rosaceae genera
Trees of China
Plants used in bonsai
Fruit trees